Dickerson Run is an unincorporated community in Fayette County, Pennsylvania, United States. Dickerson Run has a post office with ZIP code 15430, which opened on July 26, 1889.

References

Unincorporated communities in Fayette County, Pennsylvania
Unincorporated communities in Pennsylvania